Abeer Odeh is a Palestinian politician who is the first woman to serve as the Minister of National Economy in the Palestinian Authority. She has held multiple international positions in the fields of finance and economics.

Education
Odeh received her BA in Accounting from Birzeit University, in the West Bank. She received her MBA from the Kellogg School of Management at Northwestern University (1999–2001), in the United States. Odeh is also certified by the American Institute of Certified Public Accountants.

Career and activism
Odeh held multiple senior management positions within the private sector and with donor agencies. She worked as an Auditor in the public sector from 1987 till 1995. Odeh worked as a Project Director at the World Bank from 1998 till 2000. From 2001 till 2009, she worked as Chief Financial Analyst at USAID in the West Bank and Gaza. She spent six years working as the Chief Executive Officer for the Palestine Capital Markets Authority (PCMA) (from 2009 till 2015). In 2015, she was appointed the Minister of National Economy in Palestine, becoming the first woman to serve in this position. She served as Minister of National Economy three years. Currently, she is the Ambassador of the State of Palestine to Italy, since 2019.
 
As a Minister, she chaired the Palestinian Investment Promotion Agency (PIPA), Palestine Industrial Estates and the Free Zones Authority (PIEFZA), and the Palestine Standards Institute (PSI). Odeh is an advocate for Palestinian rights. As Ambassador from Palestine to Italy, Odeh released a statement calling for international support of Palestinian rights. In it, she highlighted Palestine's peaceful efforts to resist, but also noted that it is "understandable for an oppressed people to try to exercise their right to self-defense" (translated from Italian).

References

Living people
Birzeit University alumni
1962 births
People from Ramallah and al-Bireh Governorate
Ambassadors of the State of Palestine to Italy
Palestinian women ambassadors
Palestinian women in politics
Palestinian women economists
Palestinian expatriates in the United States
Government ministers of the State of Palestine
Women government ministers of the Palestinian National Authority
Northwestern University alumni